Shellbrook is a rural community in Saskatchewan, Canada located  west of Prince Albert. The population of the town was 1,433 in 2011. 
Highways 3, 40, and 55 provide access to the community.
Approximately 50 businesses provide a wide range of goods, services, and professional expertise.

History 
Settlers began arriving in the area in the late 19th century and, in 1894, a post office named after the Shell Brook was established. Larger numbers of settlers began to arrive in the district in the early 20th century, with significant representation from people of British and Scandinavian origins. In 1910, the Canadian Northern Railway reached Shellbrook from Prince Albert and the community developed as a service centre for the surrounding agricultural region.

Geography
The Shell Brook (now known as Shell River) passes just to the north of the present community, flowing east to the Sturgeon River, which in turn flows into the North Saskatchewan River west of Prince Albert. The community is situated near the northern edge of agricultural settlement in the transition zone between the aspen parkland and boreal forest biomes and as the early settlers arrived the land had to be cleared of the jack pine forests before crops could be planted. The trees, however, provided an early cash crop and logs were rafted into Prince Albert where many were converted into railway ties.

Demographics 

Attractions
The town has a library, and a museum located in the former Canadian Northern Railway station built in 1909. The town's golf course is rated as one of the finest in the province. Additionally, Prince Albert National Park is just a short drive north of the community and there are seven Regional Parks and numerous lakes in the district, accommodating fishing, swimming, boating and camping.

Notable people
One of Canada's most respected writers, James Sinclair Ross, was born in the Wild Rose School District just northeast of Shellbrook in 1908.
Curling champion Marliese Miller (Kasner) is a resident of Shellbrook.
Scott Moe - 15th and current Premier of Saskatchewan 
Terry Simpson - Former WHL and NHL Head Coach

See also
Shellbrook Airport

References

Towns in Saskatchewan
Division No. 16, Saskatchewan